The sj-sound is a voiceless fricative phoneme found in the sound system of most dialects of Swedish. It has a variety of realisations, whose precise phonetic characterisation is a matter of debate, but which usually feature distinct labialization.

The sound is transcribed  in the International Phonetic Alphabet. The International Phonetic Association (IPA) describes it as a "simultaneous  and ", but this realization is not attested from any language, and phoneticians doubt that it occurs in other languages.
Other descriptive labels include:
 Voiceless postalveolo-velar fricative
 Voiceless palatal-velar fricative
 Voiceless dorso-palatal velar fricative
 Voiceless postalveolar and velar fricative
 Voiceless coarticulated velar and palatoalveolar fricative

The closest sound found in English, as well as many other languages, is the voiceless postalveolar fricative  (Swedish words with the sound correspond to English words with "sh"), with another approximation being the voiceless labialized velar approximant  found in some English dialects. Regionally, it varies from being more -like in the standard speech, to being more -like in northern Sweden and Finland.

Features
Features of the sj-sound:

 Its place of articulation varies by dialect, but usually include a velar component.

Occurrence

Dialects of Swedish

This sound has been reported in certain dialects of Swedish, where it is most often known as the sj-sound.

Its place of articulation varies over Swedish regions and is not agreed upon. It has been variously found to be the following:
 velar and postalveolar, meaning it is articulated simultaneously with the tongue dorsum (i.e. the back part of the tongue) approximating the velum (i.e. the soft palate, like ) and just behind the teeth (like ). However, doubly articulated fricatives are very difficult to pronounce or to hear, and many linguists doubt that they exist.
(The English sigh of relief phew! is one approximation, as is the voiceless labial-velar approximant that is used in some varieties of English.) He does not use the symbol  for this allophone.
 Lindblad describes the second common variant of Swedish  as velar. The difference between it and the cardinal velar  is not clear, but it may have less friction , or be further forward , or both.
 Riad notes that the basic dorsal place of assimilation can be determined by the place of assimilation of a preceding nasal, with en skjorta 'a shirt', for example, being pronounced . He notes a labialized allophone .
 A number of intermediate possibilities between these extremes.
 Other articulations have been described as well, with no obvious standard emerging.

Consider the following comments by Peter Ladefoged and Ian Maddieson:

Kölsch

Whether or not there is a relation between Swedish  and the Kölsch  is not known. While none seems to have been established, comments suggest that the choice of  might well have been based upon a misunderstanding. Certainly, the Kölsch  is not doubly articulated and even contrasts with a slightly velarized .

Some phoneticians suggest that  is a better symbol for this sound, but this is not established practice, and may need further research.

Himalayan languages
The symbol is also used in describing a sound in the Bahing language of Nepal.

See also
 Index of phonetics articles
 Rheinische Dokumenta

Notes

References

External links
 

Fricative consonants
Swedish language
Co-articulated consonants
Voiceless oral consonants
Central consonants
Pulmonic consonants